100 Black Men of America is a men's civic organization and service club whose stated goal is to educate and empower African-American children and teens. As of 2009, the organization has 110 chapters and more than 10,000 members in different cities in the United States and throughout the world. The organization's mission statement is "to improve the quality of life within our communities and enhance educational and economic opportunities for all African Americans." The organization’s mottos "real men giving real-time" and "what they see is what they’ll be" describe the organization's goals of providing positive role models and leaders to guide the next generation of African Americans and other youth. The members are predominantly African-American professionals, businessmen, civic leaders and administrators, educators, and other occupations.

History
The initial idea for 100 Black Men of America was conceived in New York in 1963 by a group of African American professionals who wanted to improve the quality of life and economic opportunities for the black community by fostering better education and youth development.  Elements of the organization’s creed that date from this era (“e.g. no member shall be without transportation, no member shall be without legal representation, etc.”) provide some insight into the challenges faced by many African American organizations during the height of the Civil Rights Movement of the early 1960s. Some of the early members were David Dinkins and Jackie Robinson.

By 1976 a separate chapter was formed in New Jersey and before 1987 other chapters formed in most major U.S. cities. Between 1983 and 1986 these chapters held several national conferences with the aim of forming a more official national organization. On May 27, 1987, 100 Black Men of America, Inc. held its first national conference in Atlanta, Georgia, with businessman Nathaniel Goldstein as its first president and chairman of the board.

In 1994, the organization established the Collegiate 100 as an auxiliary to its chapters throughout the nation. The Collegiate 100 is composed of only young men actively enrolled in college.  The Collegiate 100 members provide support for the chapters as well as receive mentoring from chapter members.

In 2010, the organization established an auxiliary for young professional men known as the Emerging 100.  The Emerging 100 focuses on the recruitment and engagement of men between the ages of 22 and 35.  Atlanta was the first city to establish an Emerging 100 auxiliary.

Organization and membership

100 Black Men consists of over 98 local chapters (each named after their respective region, e.g., 100 Black Men of New York, 100 Black Men of Atlanta, etc.)  100 Black Men of America is the overarching organization that provides a national governing structure, charters new chapters, and provides for inter-chapter coordination.  100 Black Men is a non-profit 501 c3 organization and has no political or religious affiliations or ties.

Membership procedures vary by chapter; generally, speaking members can apply to a local chapter at specific times of the year.  Candidates are screened and then interviewed by a panel to ensure that individuals have the character and standing to serve as community role models and youth mentors.  Members generally refer to the organization simply as “The 100.”

Programs

100 Black Men has five principal program areas: Mentoring, Education, Health and Wellness, Economic Development, and Leadership Development. As of 2017, 100 Black Men has more than 100,000 students enrolled in its mentoring and outreach programs. The organization also has some 36 chapters of the Collegiate 100 at colleges and universities throughout the nation.
 Mentoring The organization provides youth mentoring that addresses the emotional and cultural needs of African American children aged 8 – 18.  Members are trained to become mentors and advocates for youth who may have few or no other positive role models in their communities.  Programs vary from chapter to chapter and range from informal one-on-one mentoring programs to complete youth academies.
 Education Seeks to provide support services to schools, and educators in the form of volunteerism, “teacher for a day” programs and extracurricular activities.  This element also works to influence policy set at the local, state, and federal levels to ensure that all youth have equal access to education.
 Health and Wellness The organization has extensive programs which are designed to encourage physical fitness and healthy eating habits among youth as well as increase public awareness of the specific health issues and risks facing African Americans (e.g. heart disease, hypertension, diabetes, sickle cell, prostate cancer, etc.).  100 Black Men hosts numerous track meets, athletic events, public outreach, and health screening events.
 Economic Development Seeks to empower African American individuals and enterprises through financial literacy training,  small business training, and seminars, as well as forums to connect African American businesses with each other and to the larger community as a whole.
 Leadership Development  To provide opportunities to develop, create, encourage, and empower the next generation of leaders for service to the community through engagement in programs that will stimulate growth, enhance personal and professional development, and facilitate of initiatives that fosters altruism for the members and the community.

Some notable developments
In 2015, the 100 Black Men of America became an active partner of the Celebration Bowl held in Atlanta, GA.

In 2009, several leaders of the organization were interviewed by CNN’s T.J. Holmes to discuss their views on President Barack Obama’s first 100 days as US president.  100 Black Men’s Health and Wellness programs were the subject of a news story feature by CNN’s Dr. Sanjay Gupta About how former Surgeon General David Satcher is leading a charge to promote healthy eating among African American youth.  CNN also featured a video article on 100 Black Men of Atlanta’s youth “Robotics Team” that is competing on a national and international level.

According to an August 27, 2007, article in the Pittsburgh Post-Gazette, 100 Black Men of Western Pennsylvania teamed up with Carnegie Mellon University to provide a 14-week summer program for teenagers to learn about computer science. During the program, which was free to participants, the teenagers learned the basics of computer science, information technology, and the World Wide Web. This is the seventh summer that this program has taken place.

In 2001, the 100 Black Men of Long Island Development Group purchased a former bus terminal in Hempstead. The organization proposed converting the building into affordable housing, and housing for people with disabilities. Questions about the organization's ability to fund such a project were raised and continued for several years before being resolved in 2016 by a sale of the building.

According to a May 24, 2004, article in the San Francisco Chronicle, the Bay Area (San Francisco) chapter signed a pledge not to accept funding from tobacco companies.

Partial list of prominent members
 David Dinkins (deceased)
 James E. Graves Jr.
 Michael Misick
 Jackie Robinson (deceased)
 David Satcher, Former US Surgeon General
 William Thompson
 Mike Espy
 Alonzo Mourning
 Kendrick Meek, U.S. Congressman
 Kevin Liles
 Tom Joyner
 Charles Rangel
 Eric Holder, 1st African-American U.S. Attorney General
 J. Bruce Llewellyn (deceased)
 Cyril deGrasse Tyson (founding member)
 Roscoe Brown
 John Collins-Muhammad, Youngest St. Louis Councilman in History
 Sylvester Turner, Mayor, City of Houston

See also

 Extra Mile Education Foundation
 Marva Collins
 National Coalition of 100 Black Women

References

External links
 
 Article:  Thousands Attend 100 Black Men Annual Conference in Orlando
 New York Times: J. Bruce Llewellyn, Who Forged a Path For Blacks in Business, Is Dead at 82

African-American organizations
African-American upper class
1963 establishments in the United States
Organizations established in 1963
1963 establishments in New York City